EE Jump (stylized as EE JUMP) was a Japanese duo formed by Harmony Production in 2000. The duo's music was produced by Tsunku, with songs released through Toy's Factory. The members consisted of Sonim (lead vocals) and Yuki (rapper).

EE Jump became well-known for their song "Otto Totto Natsu da ze!", which charted at No. 5 on the Oricon Weekly Singles Chart. However, after several scandals involving Yuki, the duo disbanded in April 2002.

History

Pre-debut

In 1999, three teenagers were scouted by Harmony Promotion and were assigned to a group under the name "EE Jump", a pun of the Japanese phrase . The group's music was produced by Tsunku. Sonim auditioned for Morning Musume's third generation and was scouted by their manager, Kaoru Wada, to be the group's lead vocalist; Yuki Goto, the younger brother of then-Morning Musume member Maki Goto, was scouted while at one of his sister's events and became the group's rapper. Half-Canadian, half-Japanese Ken was assigned the group's dancer. The trio made their first television appearance on Warau Inu no Bōken to perform a dance routine. Shortly before their CD debut, Ken left the agency.

2000-2001: Debut

EE Jump released their debut single, "Love is Energy!", on October 18, 2000, which served as the theme song for Warau Inu no Bōken. The music video was filmed in Manhattan, New York. Their single was followed up by "Hello! Atarashii Watashi" on January 24, 2001. Their third single, "Otto Totto Natsu da ze!", was released on May 16, 2001 as the theme song for Hey! Hey! Hey! Music Champ. The song became a summer hit, charting at #5 on Oricon. EE Jump also had their own weekly radio show on Mondays, titled .

EE Jump's fourth single, "Iki na Rhythm!", was released on August 29, 2001. However, during the single's promotions, Yuki had an argument with the group's female manager over their crowded work schedules, which led to him physically assaulting her, checking out of his hotel room without permission, and fleeing to Tochigi Prefecture. In response, chief manager Kaoru Wada suspended his activities for three months. During this time, Sonim continued activities without him, releasing their fifth single, "Winter (Samui Kisetsu no Monogatari)", on November 28, 2001 under the name EE Jump featuring Sonim.

2002: Disbandment

In February 2002, Yuki eventually rejoined the group after releasing an apology, and EE Jump released their sixth single, "Seishun no Sunrise", on March 6, 2002. Shortly after graduating middle school, he was photographed by tabloid magazine Friday at a cabaret club drinking alcohol while underage with a member of Johnny's Jr. Wada warned Yuki to keep his personal life private, but after Yuki refused, Wada and Tsunku agreed to revoke his contract in April 2002. EE Jump's first album, titled EE Jump Collection 1, was scheduled for release on May 9, 2002, but it was cancelled upon his dismissal. After Yuki's dismissal, EE Jump disbanded and the group was rebranded to promote Sonim as a solo artist. The songs "Ai wa Motto Sou Janakute", "Missing You", and "Ada Boy & Da Girl", which were originally written for EE Jump's cancelled album, were re-recorded and released as B-sides to Sonim's singles.

Members

Discography

Studio albums

Singles

References 

Musical groups established in 2000
Musical groups disestablished in 2002
Japanese idol groups
Japanese musical duos